Browndell is a city in Jasper County, Texas, United States. The population was 160 at the 2020 census.

Geography

Browndell is located in northern Jasper County at  (31.120251, –93.982003). U.S. Route 96 runs along the western border of the city, leading south  to Jasper, the county seat, and north  to Pineland.

Demographics

As of the 2020 United States census, there were 160 people, 49 households, and 41 families residing in the city.

As of the census of 2000, there were 219 people, 79 households, and 54 families residing in the city. The population density was 90.5 people per square mile (34.9/km2). There were 118 housing units at an average density of 48.7 per square mile (18.8/km2). The racial makeup of the city was 38.36% White, 60.73% African American, and 0.91% from two or more races.

There were 79 households, out of which 29.1% had children under the age of 18 living with them, 43.0% were married couples living together, 24.1% had a female householder with no husband present, and 30.4% were non-families. 26.6% of all households were made up of individuals, and 12.7% had someone living alone who was 65 years of age or older. The average household size was 2.77 and the average family size was 3.35.

In the city, the population was spread out, with 29.2% under the age of 18, 5.9% from 18 to 24, 28.8% from 25 to 44, 21.9% from 45 to 64, and 14.2% who were 65 years of age or older. The median age was 38 years. For every 100 females, there were 95.5 males. For every 100 females age 18 and over, there were 82.4 males.

The median income for a household in the city was $25,313, and the median income for a family was $29,583. Males had a median income of $27,500 versus $15,804 for females. The per capita income for the city was $11,229. About 15.3% of families and 14.3% of the population were below the poverty line, including 8.5% of those under the age of eighteen and 31.0% of those 65 or over.

Education
Browndell is served by the Brookeland Independent School District.

References

Cities in Texas
Cities in Jasper County, Texas